Vilém Jakl (born 22 February 1915, date of death unknown) was a Czech cyclist. He competed in the individual and team road race events at the 1936 Summer Olympics.

References

External links
 

1915 births
Year of death missing
Czech male cyclists
Olympic cyclists of Czechoslovakia
Cyclists at the 1936 Summer Olympics
Place of birth missing